Anthony Syhre (born 18 March 1995) is a German professional footballer who plays as a centre back.

Club career 
Syhre started playing football with local Berlin clubs Nordberliner SC and SC Heiligensee. In 2007, he joined the youth ranks of Hertha BSC where he eventually made it into second team, playing in fourth tier Regionalliga Nordost. Remarkably, he was directly promoted from the under-17 to the second team by skipping to play for the under-19 squad.

In early October 2012, he was for the first time close to being called up for a senior team match. However, he wasn't even chosen as a potential substitute and did not receive his first and only call for the first team until 25 March 2014, when he was an on the bench in a Bundesliga match versus Bayern Munich. In July 2015, he made the move to leave his native Berlin for 3. Liga side VfL Osnabrück signing a contract until 2017.

On 31 January 2022, Syhre joined 3. Liga club FSV Zwickau.

International career 
Syhre was a member of the Germany under-20 team. Previously he also played for the under-19 team, where he was part of the winning squad at the 2014 European Championships, and the under-18 and under-15 teams.

Honours 
Germany U19
 UEFA Under-19 Championship: 2014

Individual
 Fritz Walter Medal U18 Bronze: 2013

References

External links 
 

1995 births
Footballers from Berlin
Living people
German footballers
Germany youth international footballers
Association football defenders
Hertha BSC II players
VfL Osnabrück players
Würzburger Kickers players
Fortuna Sittard players
Hallescher FC players
FSV Zwickau players
3. Liga players
Eredivisie players
German expatriate footballers
Expatriate footballers in the Netherlands
German expatriate sportspeople in the Netherlands